Alice Fleming, (August 9, 1882 – December 6, 1952)  was a character actress in many films who also enjoyed considerable success on Broadway. She is best remembered as the Duchess, Wild Bill Elliott’s aunt in the Republic Pictures' Red Ryder Western features.

Biography
Born in Brooklyn, New York, Fleming was the leading actress with the Harry Davis, Baker, and Percy G. Williams stock companies. Her Broadway credits included When We Are Married (1939), Window Shopping (1938), 30 Days Hath September (1938), Stick-in-the-Mud (1935), One More Honeymoon (1934), The Pelican (1925), Thrills (1925), So this is Politics (Strange Bedfellows) (1924), The Lullaby (1923), Morphia (1923), The Masked Woman (1922), and As Ye Mould (1921).

Fleming appeared in several silent films, usually playing a young society matron. In the 1921 film His Greatest Sacrifice, she played William Farnum's wife. Her final film was Storm Over Lisbon (1944).

In 1910, Fleming married real estate agent Clarence V. Everett. She later married William Day. She died on December 6, 1952, in New York City.

Filmography

1946 – Queen of Burlesque as Annie Morris
1946 – The Dark Horse as Mrs. Garfield 
1946 – Sun Valley Cyclone as The Duchess
1946 – The Dark Corner in Minor Role 
1946 – The Dark Corner  
1946 – Mantrap 
1946 – Sheriff of Redwood Valley as The Duchess
1946 – California Gold Rush as The Duchess
1945 – Wagon Wheels Westward as The Duchess
1945 – Saratoga Trunk as Woman on Piazza 
1945 – Colorado Pioneers as The Duchess
1945 – Marshal of Laredo as The Duchess
1945 – Phantom of the Plains as The Duchess, Red's Aunt
1945 – State Fair as Food Judge 
1945 – Lone Texas Ranger as The Duchess, Red's Aunt
1945 – A Medal for Benny as Dowager 
1945 – The Affairs of Susan as Dowager 
1945 – It's a Pleasure as Carrie 
1945 – Great Stagecoach Robbery as The Duchess
1945 – Youth for the Kingdom as Mrs. Webber
1944 – Sheriff of Las Vegas as The Duchess
1944 – Sunday Dinner for a Soldier in Minor Role 
1944 – Three Is a Family as Grandmother 
1944 – Vigilantes of Dodge City as The Duchess
1944 – Storm Over Lisbon as Agatha Sanford-Richards
1944 – Cheyenne Wildcat as The Duchess
1944 – In Society as Dowager 
1944 – The San Antonio Kid as The Duchess
1944 – Reckless Age as Irish Woman 
1944 – Marshal of Reno as The Duchess
1944 – Tucson Raiders as The Duchess
1944 – Her Primitive Man as Wealthy Lady 
1944 – Phantom Lady as Apple Annie 
1943 – Moonlight in Vermont as Mrs. Finchley
1943 – Mystery Broadcast as Mida Kent
1943 – Overland Mail Robbery as Mrs. Patterson
1943 – Fired Wife in Minor Role 
1943 – Headin' for God's Country in Minor Role 
1943 – The Mantrap as Miss Mason
1943 – Sherlock Holmes in Washington as Mrs. Jellison 
1943 – Keep 'Em Slugging as Matron 
1942 – Who Done It? as Mrs. Laffingwell Telephoning Moscow 
1941 – Playmates as Mrs. Penelope Pennypacker 
1937 – Dick Tracy (serial) as Orphanage Matron 
1922 – Silas Marner as Dolly Winthrop
1921 – The Conquest of Canaan as Claudine
1921 – His Greatest Sacrifice as Alice Hall 
1921 – Women Men Love 
1919 – The Pleasant Devil as Mrs. Thorndyke-Brook
1919 – The Beloved Cheater as Brook

See also
Red Ryder
Vigilantes of Dodge City

References

External links
 
 The Character Actresses, Alice Fleming, The Old Coral

1882 births
1952 deaths
20th-century American actresses
American film actresses
American stage actresses
Western (genre) film actresses